Jacob Ockers House is a historic home located at Oakdale in Suffolk County, New York.  It was built in 1880 and is a -story, four- by two-bay, frame dwelling with single story wings extending from the east and north elevations.  It is sheathed in clapboard and rests on a brick foundation.  It features a verandah with Doric order columns supporting the cornice.

The house was owned by Jacob Ockers who organized the Bluepoint Oyster Company. It was added to the National Register of Historic Places in 1992.

References

Houses on the National Register of Historic Places in New York (state)
Houses in Suffolk County, New York
National Register of Historic Places in Suffolk County, New York